The Paul Eames Sports Complex is a minor league baseball stadium, located in Albany, Georgia.  The stadium was the home of the South Georgia Peanuts, of the South Coast League, prior to the folding of the league in 2008. It was the former home of the Albany Polecats, the Albany Alligators and the South Georgia Waves and the South Georgia Peanuts before the team moved to Columbus, Georgia to become the Columbus Catfish.  The complex was known as 'Polecat Park' when the Polecats team played there.

The Colorado Silver Bullets, an all-female professional baseball team, played a number of games at the complex as a "home team" in the 1995 and 1996 seasons.

References

Sports venues in Georgia (U.S. state)
Minor league baseball venues
Buildings and structures in Albany, Georgia
Tourist attractions in Albany, Georgia
South Coast League venues
Sports in Albany, Georgia